Cheto is a district of the Chachapoyas Province in the Amazonas Region in Peru. Its seat is Cheto located at an altitude of 2,500 m.s.n.m..

During the 2005 Peru census the district had 686 inhabitants.

See also 
 Purum Llaqta

External links
Cheto district official website 

1953 establishments in Peru
States and territories established in 1953
Districts of the Chachapoyas Province
Districts of the Amazonas Region